Panolis is a moth genus in the family Noctuidae.

Species
 Panolis exquisita Draudt, 1950
 Panolis flammea (Denis & Schiffermüller, 1775)
 Panolis japonica Draudt, 1935
 Panolis pinicortex Draudt, 1950
 Panolis variegatoides (Poole, 1989)
 Panolis ningshan sp. nov.
 Panolis estheri

References
 
 Panolis at funet
 Phylogeny, Systematics and Biogeography of the Genus Panolis (Lepidoptera: Noctuidae) Based on Morphological and Molecular Evidence

 
Orthosiini